Gościeradów-Kolonia is a village in the administrative district of Gmina Gościeradów, within Kraśnik County, Lublin Voivodeship, in eastern Poland.

References

Villages in Kraśnik County